What Do You Say may refer to:
"What Do You Say" (Reba McEntire song)
"What Do You Say" (Filter song)